Éric Danon (born February 22, 1957) is a French diplomat.

He has served as French Ambassador to Israel since August 2019.

Biography

Graduate studies 
After secondary studies and preparatory classes at the Lycée Louis-le-Grand in Paris, Éric Danon joined the École Normale Supérieure of Saint-Cloud. He received the aggregation of physical sciences in 1980.

He obtained an additional year of school to complete his specialization in nuclear physics. He then did military service from 1982 to 1983 in the Air Force as "contingent scientific engineer". Assigned to the LRBA (Ballistic and Aerodynamic Research Laboratory) in Vernon, he worked there for a year on systems for carrying nuclear charges on board strategic missiles.

At the same time, he was admitted to Sciences Po Paris in 1979, from which he graduated in 1983; he then joined the National School of Administration.

Career 
Éric Danon has devoted most of his career, in both the public and private sectors, to strategic issues, to the fight against contemporary criminal threats and to cooperation with developing countries.

Ambassador to Israel 
On June 21, 2019, Éric Danon was appointed by President Emmanuel Macron, Extraordinary and Plenipotentiary Ambassador of the French Republic to the State of Israel.

In January 2020, four months after Éric Danon took office, Emmanuel Macron made his first visit to Israel as president, performing several significant symbolic acts there.

Private Life 
Éric Danon is married to Marie-Christine Dupuis-Danon and is a father of five children.

References 

 .
 .
 Remise des insignes de Chevalier de la Légion d’Honneur par M. Jean-Yves Le Drian, le 20 février 2019.
 .
 Recherche « Danon Éric », sur lyon-normalesup.org/Annuaire.
 .
 .
 .
 Témoignage d’Eric Danon pour le livre de Nicolas Dufourcq « Retour sur la fin de la guerre froide et la réunification allemande » pp. 136–141 Odile Jacob 2020.
 , texte , NOR: MAEA0761691D:
 , texte 40, NOR MAEA0807441D.
 Interview d'Éric Danon sur la Première Commission des Nations Unies (en vidéo / YouTube)
 Discours d'Éric Danon à l'ouverture de la Première Commission de l'ONU (5 octobre 2010)
 Discours d’Éric Danon devant la Conférence d’Examen des États parties au TNP à New York, 4 mai 2010.
 Entretien d’Éric Danon avec le blog américain Daily Kos, 23 mai 2010].
 Article Les Échos du 1er février 2010 (composition de la Commission Roussely).
 Cité par Antoine Glaser et Thomas Hoffnung dans leur livre "Nos chers espions en Afrique » Fayard 2020, page 161.
 Le CSFRS
 Les IVèmes Assises Nationales de la Recherche Stratégique (en vidéo)
 Les Vèmes Assises Nationales de la Recherche Stratégique (en vidéo)
 Les VIes Assises Nationales de la Recherche Stratégique (en vidéo)
 Émission RFI Géopolitique Le Débat sur Qui est l'ennemi ? 6 décembre 2015.
 Teaser du MOOC Questions stratégiques (en vidéo)
 
 
 Convention internationale pour la répression du financement du terrorisme (Texte et présentation au Sénat)
 ELVA SA gagne le prix IST 2005 p. 20
 Article RFI sur le lancement de la négociation d'un Traité sur le Commerce des Armes, 24 juillet 2010.
 Émission RFI Géopolitique Le Débat sur la négociation du TCA 2 juillet 2011 1er.
 Émission RFI Géopolitique Le Débat sur la négociation du TCA 2 juillet 2011 2e.
 Interview d'Eric Danon sur le TCA dans Le Point du 29 mai 2013
 Interpol - Fondation pour un monde plus sûr.
 Référence de l'enseignement de criminologie (sur le site du CNAM).
 Arrêté du 11 février 1999 portant nomination au cabinet du ministre JORF  du 14 février 1999 page 2373 NOR: MAEC9900004A
 .
 Arrêté du 10 octobre 2000 portant cessation de fonctions et nomination au cabinet du ministre délégué JORF  du 13 octobre 2000 NOR : MAEC0000029A
 Article Africaintelligence du 16 mars 2006 
 Article Africaintelligence du 22 février 2007 
 Itw France Inter / Eric Danon : Je suis un dommage collatéral
 Itw Le nouvel obs / Affaire Kouchner : le cofondateur d'Imeda s'explique
 .
 Article Libération / La toile africaine de Bernard Kouchner
 Article Paris Match : Voyage dans la galaxie des sociétés amies de Kouchner
 Eric Danon nommé Professionnal of the year 2013 / International Affairs.
 Le Cercle K2
 Les membres fondateurs du Cercle K2
 La foundation House of the Rising Stars
 Émission du 24 avril 2017 Le Talk stratégique du Figaro.
 Itw IRIS du 27 février 2019 (Podcast) sur les défis de la diplomatie française.
 Émission RFI Géopolitique Le Débat 26 avril 2015 sur la Conférence d'examen du TNP 2015.
 Émission RFI Géopolitique Le Débat, 30 mai 2015 sur la Conférence d'examen du TNP 2015.
 Émission RFI Géopolitique Le Débat, 9 avril 2017 sur la négociation d'un Traité d'interdiction des armes nucléaires.
 Itw Diploweb, 15 novembre 2017, La dissuasion nucléaire a-t-elle un avenir ?.
 Conférence Diploweb/GEM, 15 novembre 2017, La dissuasion nucléaire a-t-elle un avenir.
 Émission RFI Géopolitique Le Débat sur Le Moyen-Orient et le grand bazar des armes, 13 mars 2016
 Débat iReMMO du 9 mars 2016 : D'où viennent les armes au Moyen Orient ?.
 Émission RFI Géopolitique Le Débat sur Armes légères et de petit calibre : un fléau mondial, 16 juin 2018
 Interview France 24 du 27 juillet 2016
 L'entretien, France 24 du 20 août 2016
 Interview i24 du 11 septembre 2017
 Conférence « Quels futurs pour le terrorisme ? » à la Sorbonne, le 18 avril 2019
 Article du Times of Israël, 12 septembre 2019
 Emission Elie sans interdit'’ sur i24news du 5 janvier 2020
 Emission Elie sans interdit'’ sur i24news du 5 mai 2020
 Emission spéciale sur Kan en français, 14 juillet 2020
 Article TelAvivre du 3 juillet 2019
 Discours prononcés le 14 juillet 2021 à la Résidence de France
 Itw i24news du 14 juillet 2021 à l’occasion de la fête nationale
 .

1957 births
Living people
French diplomats
Ambassadors to Israel